Pinus montana can refer to:

Pinus montana Hoffm., a synonym of Pinus sylvestris var. sylvestris, the main variety of Scots pine
Pinus montana Lam., a synonym of Pinus cembra L.
Pinus montana Mill., a synonym of Pinus mugo Turra
Pinus montana Salisb., a synonym of Pinus cembra L.